Zenret Troy Pelshak (born March 6, 1977) is a former American football linebacker who played two seasons in the National Football League with the St. Louis Rams and Jacksonville Jaguars. He played college football at North Carolina Agricultural and Technical State University and attended Garinger High School in Charlotte, North Carolina. Pelshak was also a member of the Barcelona Dragons of NFL Europe. He played three seasons in the Arena Football League with the Carolina Cobras, Columbus Destroyers and New York Dragons. He was a member of the St. Louis Rams team that won Super Bowl XXXIV over the Tennessee Titans.

References

External links
Just Sports Stats
Fanbase profile
Troy Pelshak on Twitter

Living people
1977 births
Players of American football from Charlotte, North Carolina
American football linebackers
African-American players of American football
North Carolina A&T Aggies football players
St. Louis Rams players
Jacksonville Jaguars players
Barcelona Dragons players
Carolina Cobras players
Columbus Destroyers players
New York Dragons players
Nigerian players of American football
American sportspeople of Nigerian descent